E.S. Madima was a South African writer in the Venda language.

In 1954, Madima wrote the first novel in Venda, A Si Ene. It was later translated into English by his son, Tenda Madima. E.S. Madima was awarded the SALA Literary Lifetime Achievement Award in 2005.

Novels
 A Si Ene (Not this one) (1954)
 Maduvha Ha Fani (Days Are Not the Same/Similar)
 Hu Na Savhadina (Beware of Savhadina)
 Mmanga Mawelewele, Maambiwa Ndi One (Rumours are True)

References

South African male novelists
Living people
Year of birth missing (living people)